Quercus dalechampii is a European species of oak in the family Fagaceae. It is native to southeastern Europe: Bulgaria, Greece and the rest of the Balkan Peninsula, Italy, Austria, Hungary, Slovakia, and the Czech Republic.

References

External links

Encyclopedia of Life

dalechampii
Trees of Europe
Plants described in 1830